Brigadier Ord Henderson Tidbury, MC (10 December 1888 – 14 July 1961) was a senior officer in the British Army.

Early life and family
Ord Henderson Tidbury was born on 10 December 1888, the son of Lieutenant Colonel James Tidbury (died 1936), of North Bend, Woking in Surrey, an officer the Royal Army Medical Corps, and his wife Agnes (died 1945), daughter of Robert Henderson of Glasgow and Leghorn. In 1924, he married Beryl Marjorie, only daughter of C. M. Pearce of Dundarach, Camberley (formerly of Calcutta), and had at least one son, Sir Charles Henderson Tidbury (1926–2003), who married Anne, daughter of Brigadier H. E. Russell. Beryl Tidbury was a founder of the Hong Kong Fellowship for supporting relatives of British prisoners of war; she died in 1955. Four years later, Ord Tidbury married Joan Windham, daughter of Ashe Windham. After her husband's death, she married Major Hugh D'Oyly Lyle (died 1977), son of Colonel Thomas Lyle and a descendant of the D'Oyly baronets, and died in 1990.

Military career
Tidbury was gazetted a second lieutenant in the Middlesex Regiment on 9 October 1907. Promotion to lieutenant followed on 1 February 1911, and he was a temporary captain between 8 October 1914 and 10 December 1914. The following day, he became a substantive captain. He was a staff captain in France between May 1915 and December 1916, before serving as deputy assistant adjutant, quartermaster general and DAAG for France and Italy, which office he held until 17 May 1918. He was then posted as DAAG in France until 19 January 1920, when he transferred to the British Military Mission to Berlin as assistant quartermaster general. On 3 June 1918, he was promoted to brevet major, a rank he held until he was made a full major on 5 May 1927. Tidbury was twice wounded during the First World War; he was mentioned in despatches three times, received the Belgian Order of the Crown (4th Class) and the Italian Order of the Crown (5th Class).

After his work in Germany, Tidbury was employed by the Foreign Office as part of the North Silesian Plebiscite Commission until 1922. He held various postings as a general staff officer between then and 1935 at the War Office and Egypt. Promoted to brevet lieutenant colonel in July 1937, Tibury received the full rank on New Years Day 1936 and exactly seven months later became a colonel. In these capacities, he commanded the 1st Battalion, Middlesex Regiment. On 22 August 1938, he was promoted to the temporary rank of brigadier and given command of the 18th Infantry Brigade, then serving in Mandatory Palestine during the Arab revolt. He held this post until 1940, and between 1940 and 1941 he commanded the British troops in Crete.

He died on 14 July 1961.

References

External links
Generals of World War II

1888 births
1961 deaths
British Army personnel of World War I
British Army brigadiers of World War II
British military personnel of the 1936–1939 Arab revolt in Palestine
Middlesex Regiment officers
Officers of the Order of the Crown (Belgium)
Recipients of the Military Cross